George Berkeley, 1st Earl of Berkeley PC FRS (1628 – 10 October 1698) was an English merchant and politician who sat in the House of Commons from 1654 until 1658 when he succeeded to the peerage.

Life

Berkeley was the son of George Berkeley, 8th Baron Berkeley (d. 1658), and his wife, Elizabeth Stanhope, daughter of Sir Michael Stanhope. Berkeley was a canon-commoner at Christ Church, Oxford, but did not take any degree. In 1654 he was elected Member of Parliament for Gloucestershire in the First Protectorate Parliament. He was re-elected MP for Gloucestershire in 1656 for the Second Protectorate Parliament. 

Berkeley succeeded to the barony in 1658, and was nominated in May 1660 as one of the commissioners to proceed to the Hague and invite Charles II to return to the kingdom. In the following November he was made keeper of the house gardens and parks of Nonsuch Palace, where the Duchess of Cleveland later lived.

In 1661 Berkeley was placed on the council for foreign plantations. In 1663 he became a member of the Royal African Company on its formation (10 January), acquiring a share in the territory lying between the port of Salee in South Barbary and the Cape of Good Hope. In the same year he was elected Fellow of the Royal Society. He was made a privy councillor in 1677. In April 1678, he was made a member of the Board of Trade and plantations which had been established in 1668.

On 11 September 1679 he was created Viscount Dursley and Earl of Berkeley. He was elected to the governorship of the Levant Company on 9 February 1680 and held the position for most, if not the whole, of his subsequent life. In May 1681 he was elected one of the masters of Trinity House. At this time he was a member of the East India Company. In February 1685 he was appointed Custos Rotulorum of Gloucestershire, and 21 July 1685 was sworn of the privy council. After the flight of James II, 11 December 1688, Berkeley was among the lords who assembled at Guildhall and declared themselves a provisional government.  He was nominated as ambassador to Constantinople on 16 July 1698, but not wishing to go, petitioned parliament to be excused the office. He died in England and was buried in the parish church of Cranford, Middlesex, where he had an estate.

Works
He published in 1668 a religious work entitled Historical Applications and Occasional Meditations upon several Subjects.

Family
Berkeley married on 11 August 1646, Elizabeth Massingberd, daughter of John Massingberd, treasurer of the East India Company, by whom he had two sons, Charles and George, and six daughters:
 Charles Berkeley, 2nd Earl of Berkeley (8 April 1649 – 24 September 1710)
 Rev. Hon. George Berkeley (d. 1694); graduated M.A. at Christ Church, 9 July 1669, took holy orders, and became a prebendary of Westminster, 13 July 1687, married Jane Cole and had issue
 Lady Elizabeth Berkeley (c. 1650 – d. 1681); married William Smythe Esq. (c. 1645 – d. 1720) and had issue.
 Theophilia Smythe; married on 4 November 1696 in Westminster Abbey Arthur Moore MP and had issue, including James Moore Smythe, William Moore M.P. for Banbury, and Arthur Moore Smythe.
 Elizabeth (Moore) Ormond, married 1718 Wyriott Ormond Sr. of London No: 11 Meard St. London and Bath N.C. Colonial Official and had issue, including Roger Ormond or Ormand.
 Lady Theophilia Berkeley (1650 – 26 January 1706/7), married Sir Kingsmill Lucy, 2nd Baronet, and had issue. She married, secondly, Robert Nelson.
 Lady Arabella Berkeley; married Sir William Pulteney, son and heir of Sir William Pulteney, Bt., of Misterton, and had issue.
 Lady Mary Berkeley (d. 19 May 1719); married, firstly, Ford Grey, 1st Earl of Tankerville, and had issue. Married, secondly, after 22 May 1712, Richard Rooth.
 Lady Henrietta Berkeley (b. c. 1664 – 1706); unmarried, famously seduced by her sister's husband, the Earl of Tankerville, in 1681.
 Lady Arethusa Berkeley (d. 11 February 1742/3); married Charles Boyle, 3rd Viscount Dungarvan, and had issue.

References

1628 births
1698 deaths
101
Original Fellows of the Royal Society
Members of the Privy Council of England
Members of Trinity House
George
English MPs 1654–1655
English MPs 1656–1658
Politicians from Gloucestershire